Laurie Koehn (born May 13, 1982) is a former professional basketball player, who is currently the associate coach for the Washington State Cougars women's basketball team.

Education 
Born in Newton, Kansas, Koehn attended Moundridge High School in Moundridge, Kansas. Koehn graduated from Kansas State University in 2005.  While at K-state, Koehn achieved the All-Big 12 Second Team (2005, 2004), CoSIDA Academic All-American (2004), Big 12 All-Academic First Team (2005), Kansas State, Big 12 and NCAA all-time leader in three-pointers made (392). She once hit 132 out of 135 three-pointers in a 5-minute period. Over the course of her college career, she hit 392 three-pointers, making her the NCAA Division I record-holder for made three-point attempts (tied with Heather Butler), a record she held until it was surpassed by Kaleena Mosqueda-Lewis in 2015.

USA Basketball
Koehn was a member of the USA Women's U18 team which won the gold medal at the FIBA Americas Championship in Mar Del Plata, Argentina. The event was held in July 2000, when the USA team defeated Cuba to win the championship. Koehn started all five games and averaged 12.4 points per game, third highest behind Alana Beard and Diana Taurasi.

Koehn was named to the team representing the US at the 2003 Pan American Games. The team lost the opening game to Cuba, then rebounded to win their next five games, including an overtime win against Brazil. They then faced Cuba for the gold medal, falling short 75–64 to take home the silver medal. Koehn averaged 8.9 points per game while hitting 17 of 30 three-point attempts, to lead her team in made three-pointers and percentage.

Kansas  State statistics
Source

WNBA career
Koehn was signed as a free-agent with the Washington Mystics in 2005.
On April 30, 2009 Koehn signed a training camp contract with the Phoenix Mercury. On June 3, 2009 Koehn was waived along with 2 others.
Extending her professional career, Laurie played during the 2010–11 season for the "Utex Row", a women's basketball team in Poland. Unfortunately, the team ended the season ranked twelfth out of the 13 member league.  Koehn, however, performed well playing in all 14 games, averaging 17.9 points per game and tallying up an average of 36.4 minutes of play per game.

Club history
Team(s): Atlanta Dream Phoenix Mercury Washington Mystics (WNBA), Panküp TED Kayseri Kolejliler (Turkey) (2008/2009), UTEX ROW Rybnik (Poland) (2010/2011), Matizol Lider Pruszków (Poland) (2011/2012)

Coaching career
In July 2015, Laurie Koehn was named as an assistant coach for the University of Northern Colorado women's basketball team.  In April 2018, Laurie Koehn was named as an associate head coach for the Washington State University women's basketball team.

External links
University of Northern Colorado Coaching Profile
Washington State University Coaching Profile

References

1982 births
Living people
American expatriate basketball people in Poland
American expatriate basketball people in Turkey
American women's basketball players
Atlanta Dream players
Basketball players at the 2003 Pan American Games
Basketball players from Kansas
Kansas State Wildcats women's basketball players
Panküp TED Kayseri Koleji basketball players
People from McPherson County, Kansas
Point guards
Washington Mystics players
American women's basketball coaches
People from Newton, Kansas
Pan American Games competitors for the United States
United States women's national basketball team players